Jan Neliba (born 5 September 1953) is a Czech ice hockey player. He competed in the men's tournament at the 1980 Winter Olympics.

References

External links
 

1953 births
Living people
Czech ice hockey defencemen
Olympic ice hockey players of Czechoslovakia
Ice hockey players at the 1980 Winter Olympics
Sportspeople from Příbram
Rytíři Kladno players
HC Dukla Jihlava players
Czech ice hockey coaches
Czechoslovak ice hockey defencemen
Czechoslovak expatriate sportspeople in Finland
Czechoslovak expatriate ice hockey people
Expatriate ice hockey players in Finland
Czech expatriate sportspeople in Slovakia
Czech expatriate sportspeople in Finland
Czech expatriate sportspeople in Hungary
Czech expatriate ice hockey people
Czechoslovakia (WHA) players